Spelunker World was a free-to-play platform video game developed by Tozai Games and published by Square Enix. It is a sequel to Spelunker HD with many of its gameplay elements carried over - most notably its six-player multiplayer mode. Originally released on the PlayStation 4's PlayStation Store in 2015, it was later made available for the PlayStation Vita in May of the same year. The downloadable title later received a retail release in the name of Spelunker Party!, for Nintendo Switch and Microsoft Windows, with the freemium elements removed. The Japanese version of Spelunker Party! had a physical release on April 20, 2017. However, the worldwide release for Nintendo Switch and Microsoft Windows, on October 19, 2017, was downloadable only.

Gameplay
The player controls one of the four playable characters (Spelunker, Spelunkette, Dark Spelunker, and Spelunkette's Sister) in an attempt to discover treasures and reach the end of the expedition area for each level. There are a total of 100 stages to select from on a large world map. The map has four distinct sections with 25 levels each. Some of the stages occasionally become event stages - dropping an unusual amount of in-game currency or event items. This includes collaboration events featuring equipment based on other video game franchises. Once a stage has been selected, the player will have to navigate through the level by walking, jumping, and using tools at their disposal. The player can go on a solo expedition or join a six-player group online.

A finite amount of energy is available to the player's character and complete depletion would lead to death. Energy can be resupplied at checkpoints scattered throughout the cave. In case of deaths, the player's character will respawn at the last checkpoint they have passed through. Deaths can be easily caused by the hazardous environment such as traps, creatures, and ghosts. The playable characters are also known as the weakest action heroes, and they can die if you jump or fall from a slightly higher platform. Each level allows for two revives and a third death results in a game over screen. A continue can be purchased with moon gems. In multiplayer mode, other players can revive you at your last checkpoint even after you've expended your lives. However, they must reach you before the 30 second countdown ends.

Each cave is split into multiple sections, and the player is required to progress through them in order. Once a section has been cleared, the player cannot return to the previous area unless the level is restarted. Treasures known as Litho-orbs can be found throughout the level alongside items required for progression - such as colored keys that open corresponding doors. Litho-orbs go through a process known as Litho-stone evaluation at the end of the stage. The orbs are broken apart to reveal the Litho-stone fragments hidden in them. The yield is randomized, but the player would not receive a duplicate fragment until it has been used or sold. A storage space of 999 slots is available for the fragments.

Once all the fragments for a Litho-stone has been gathered, the player can complete it manually to receive the indicated equipment. Head and body equipment are available alongside accessories and pets. Equipment are used to enhance and provide new abilities for the playable characters. However, some equipment are specific to certain characters. An inventory box is available for equipment that offers 30 slots initially. The player can expand the box by five slots for every 100 moon gems. Moon gem is a premium currency purchasable through microtransactions. In spite of that, there are also in-game methods for earning them as well. Another currency, gold, can be obtained through normal gameplay. Gold can be used to upgrade equipment.

Equipment can also be gained through a method known as Doggie Digging. The feature can be accessed through the menu. The player can use in-game items, such as candies and cakes, to feed an orange spotted dog named Pooch. Pooch will then dig up a completed equipment. If those items are unavailable, the player can use moon gems instead.

Spelunker Party!

Spelunker Party!, is a revamped re-release of Spelunker World for Nintendo Switch and Microsoft Windows with the complete removal of free-to-play elements. All 100 stages from Spelunker World are included alongside new extra stages. The protagonist of the story is now Spelunkette instead of Spelunker. The overworld has been redesigned and is now separated into a world map and five stage maps. The main menu has also seen a redesign. Pooch returns to help dig up equipment. The gameplay largely remains the same, but Litho-stone fragments are now specific to stages instead of being randomized drops. Player lives has also been extended to five. Collaboration events and equipment are not included in this release. Multiplayer has gone from six-player to four-player, but with the addition of split-screen offline multiplayer.

Reception

Notes

References

External links 
  for Spelunker World
  for Spelunker Party!

Spelunker (video game)
2015 video games
Platform games
Nintendo Switch games
PlayStation 4 games
Video games developed in the United States
Windows games
PlayStation Vita games